Cerro Gordo Township is a township in Piatt County, Illinois, USA.  As of the 2010 census, its population was 2,046 and it contained 874 housing units.

Geography

Cities and towns
 Cerro Gordo

Unincorporated towns
 La Place
 Milmine

Extinct towns
 Burrowsville
 Lintner

Adjacent townships
 Willow Branch Township (north)
 Bement Township (northeast)
 Unity Township (east)
 Lovington Township, Moultrie County (south)
 Dora Township, Moultrie County (southwest)
 Long Creek Township, Macon County (west)
 Oakley Township, Macon County (west)

Cemeteries
The township contains four cemeteries: Cerro Gordo, Clover, County and LaPlace.

Major highways
  U.S. Route 36
  Illinois Route 32
  Illinois Route 105

Airports and landing strips
 White Landing Strip

Demographics

References
 U.S. Board on Geographic Names (GNIS)
 United States Census Bureau cartographic boundary files

External links
 US-Counties.com
 City-Data.com
 Illinois State Archives

Townships in Piatt County, Illinois
1859 establishments in Illinois
Populated places established in 1859
Townships in Illinois